Pote Tha Kani Xasteria or simply Xasteria, is a Greek traditional song, and specifically a Cretan rizitiko song.

Rizitika 
Rizitika songs are the oldest type of Cretan music. They mainly originate in western Crete, but are also widespread in central and eastern Crete. Rizes are the foothills of the mountains. One view says that from the roots of the mountains those songs took their name, from Ida, Dikti and the White Mountains. Another view argues that "the songs of the roots" of the ancestors, were called by the people Rizitika. Today, Rizitika considered all those songs of unknown artists that came to our day through tradition from past centuries.

Rizitika songs commonly have no conventional names, and are instead referred to by with their first verse, or with some other verse. The author Idomeneas Papageorgiorakis, in his book Τα Κρητικά ριζίτικα τραγούδια, classified them in 32 melodies, and found 31 songs to have their own unique melodies, always on major scales. Their music is serious, typically a singer first sings a verse, which is usually repeated chorally. This does not always happen, however. The songs do not always need to rhyme, and the verse does not always have fifteen syllables.

Identity of the song 

The origin of Xasteria is not clear, and the views of historians and musicologists differ. Other historians place it in the years of Ottoman rule, and others in Venetian rul, or even in the era of the Byzantine Empire. An older similar song with the following lyrics is known:

The references to the "sword" and the "stick" refer to the Acritic circle. The Mousouroi were an aristocratic family of Crete, originating from the Byzantine Empire. "Road of the Mousouroi" is the road that leads from the village of Lakkoi to Omalos, where the Mousouroi lived. The reason for writing the song, according to many, was the way the Mousouroi treated the people of the area. Others believe that these verses refer to a feud of the time, in which the Mousouroi were involved.

Over time, the lyrics became:

Covers 
Although in the beginning the song was known only in the revolutions of Crete, such as Arkadi and Therissos, after Crete was annexed by Greece in 1913 it began to be used nationwide, in various events, from World War II until Polytechneio revolt. A Cypriot variant has been written -among other things-, which is performed at events of the University of Cyprus, which instead of Omalos mentions Cypriot toponyms (Olympus, Kyrenia, Morphou, Messaria, Karpasia). Its cover by Nikos Xylouris is also known.

Further reading 

 Ανδρειώμενος, Γιώργος (2017). "Πότε θα κάνει ξαστεριά" : από τις ρίζες των Λευκών Ορέων στην πανελλήνια χρήση. Athēna.

References 

Greek songs
Cretan music